Əhmədli is a village and municipality in the Dashkasan District of Azerbaijan. The municipality consists of the villages of Ahmedli and Dardərə.

References 

Populated places in Dashkasan District